Kaiserman may refer to:

Bill Kaiserman (1942–2020), American fashion designer
Franz Kaiserman (1765–1833), Swiss painter; see Bartolomeo Pinelli
3880 Kaiserman, a minor planet